Henry Pius Masinde Muliro (June 30, 1922 – August 14, 1992) was a Kenyan politician from the Bukusu sub-tribe of the larger Abaluhya people of western Kenya. He was one of the central figures in the shaping of the political landscape in Kenya. A renowned anti-colonial activist, he campaigned for the restoration of multi-party democracy in Kenya in his later years.
He was a ruthless negotiator and a proponent of peaceful but focused politics. He had a reputation for integrity rivaled only by Ngala. He was considered by some as one of the best leaders that never became president, it has been speculated that had he not died, he may have beaten Moi for the presidency in 1992.

Early life

Henry Pius Masinde Muliro was born in Matili village, Kimilili area of Kenya, the son of Muliro Kisingilie and his wife Makinia. His farmer father was a Roman Catholic, and after his parents died, he was brought up by an older stepbrother, Aibu Naburuku. He undertook his elementary and secondary school studies in Kenya and Uganda, He attended several mission schools run by the Catholics, including the intellectually stimulating St Peter's College in Tororo, Uganda. He joined the University of Cape Town in South Africa in 1949, enrolling for a Bachelor of Arts degree in History, Philosophy and Education. He graduated in 1953 with degree in Arts and Education. In 1954 he returned home with a South African wife Marcia. He taught for a while at a government school. In 1957, he quit his job to join politics. His early political and social ideas were formed when he was at the University of Cape Town.

Political career

In 1948, Muliro had joined the Kenya African Union (KAU), a body formed to champion the interests of Africans in colonial Kenya.
When he quit teaching in 1957, he contested the Nyanza North Legislative Council seat which was then held by W.W.W. Awori (Elder brother of the former Kenyan vice president Moody Awori). Muliro won the election.
Among his fellow legislators were Daniel arap Moi representing the Rift valley, Tom Mboya representing Nairobi area, Bernard Mate representing Central Province, Ronald Ngala representing Coast Province, James Nzau Muimi representing Eastern Province, Lawrence Oguda representing Nyanza South, and Oginga Odinga representing Nyanza Central. In 1958 Muliro formed the Kenya National Party with the support of 9 Legco members. He later on dissolved his party to join the Kenya African Democratic Union (KADU). He was subsequently appointed minister of commerce just before Kenya gained independence in 1963.
Muliro worked in various positions in later governments, but was frequently on the wrong side of President Jomo Kenyatta. 

After Kenyatta's death, he vied for the Kitale East seat in the 1979 general election but the new president Daniel Arap Moi, seeking to assert his authority – ensured his old ally Muliro is rigged out in Kitale East in favour of ex-Mayor Fred Gumo. He remained in the cold between 1979—1984, he is again rigged out in the 1983 snap election by the KANU party. However, in the ensuing 1984 by-election after Gumo’s win invalidation due to ballot box stuffing, Muliro narrowly wins the resulting by-election against a Kalenjin candidate, Hon Joseph Yego in an election marred by widespread election rigging and malpractises. 

He served as the Kitale East Constituency MP until 1988, when the constituency was split up and he contested the newly created Cherangany Constituency parliamentary seat in the infamous 1988 Mlolongo election. He narrowly wins the Cherangany Constituency parliamentary seat in the 1988 election, but his election is immediately nullified. At the 1989 by-election, a newcomer Kalenjin Hon Kipruto Arap Kirwa defeats him.

Multi-party campaign

In 1989, Muliro teamed up with  Kenneth Matiba, Charles Rubia, Martin Shikuku, Phillip Gachoka and Oginga Odinga to form FORD (Forum for restoration of democracy), a pressure-group agitating for a return to pluralist politics. After violent clashes pitting FORD supporters against police and government supporters, the KANU government accepted multi-partyism in 1991. FORD became a party with Muliro as its vice chairman.

Disagreements soon cropped up with two main rivals Oginga Odinga and Kenneth Matiba each wanting to run for presidency and not wanting to listen to reason. It was Shortly after this that Muliro left for London for a fundraising mission for the newly formed  Ford political party. It was to be an ill-fated trip: on his return, upon his arrival at the Nairobi airport on the morning of August 14, 1992 he collapsed and died. The controversy of his death was heightened by the absence of an official post mortem. Muliro was buried on his rural farm in Sibanga area of Kenya.

The party, then split into two factions after Muliro died due to a disagreement on who was to run for the presidency against President Moi. Kenneth Matiba and Martin Shikuku claiming that they are the real owners of Ford splitting to form Ford Asili and Odinga and others forming Ford Kenya. Had Masinde Muliro not died, the original FORD would have remained united and possibly would have removed president Moi in 1992.

Personal life

He married Mama Marcia Muliro in 1953, a South African beauty who would later be described as a champion of education and strong-willed community development mobiliser.

Marcia quickly grasped the Bukusu culture, customs and traditions and became the pillar behind  her politician husband.

Burudi Nabwera, former ambassador and Cabinet minister once describes her as a straightforward woman who spoke her mind, complemented her husband’s political career and ensured many youth were educated.

Together they were blessed with children among them Mwambu Mukasa Muliro, who has been trying to fit into his father's shoes. The family lives in their rural farm Sibanga, Kitale where Muliro and his beloved wife Marcia were interred.

Legacy

Eponyms

Masinde Muliro University of Science and Technology, Kakamega
Masinde Muliro Stadium, Kanduyi, Bungoma
Muliro Gardens, Kakamega

References

Simiyu Wandiiba. Masinde Muliro: A Biography (Nairobi: EAEP, 1996)

1922 births
1992 deaths
Kenyan Luhya people
Kenyan democracy activists
Kenya African National Union politicians
Forum for the Restoration of Democracy politicians
Members of the Legislative Council of Kenya
Kenyan expatriates in Uganda
Kenyan expatriates in South Africa